California is a 1927 American silent Western film directed by W. S. Van Dyke and written by Marian Ainslee, Ruth Cummings and Frank Davis. The film stars Tim McCoy, Dorothy Sebastian, Marc McDermott, Frank Currier and Fred Warren. The film was released on May 7, 1927, by Metro-Goldwyn-Mayer.

Plot
The film dramatized the Battle of San Pasqual, of December 6–7, 1846, a battle of the Mexican–American War 1846-1848, in which General Stephen W. Kearny's U.S. Dragoons fought Californio lancers in the San Pasqual Valley, just east of Escondido, California.

Cast 
 Tim McCoy as Capt. Archibald Gillespie
 Dorothy Sebastian as Carlotta del Rey
 Marc McDermott as Drachano
 Frank Currier as Don Carlos del Rey
 Fred Warren as Kit Carson
 Lillian Leighton as Duenna
 Edwin Terry as Brig. Gen. Stephen W. Kearny

References

External links 
 

1927 films
1927 Western (genre) films
Metro-Goldwyn-Mayer films
Films directed by W. S. Van Dyke
American black-and-white films
Films produced by Erich Pommer
Silent American Western (genre) films
1920s English-language films
1920s American films